Ethemon is a genus of beetles in the family Cerambycidae, containing the following species:

 Ethemon basale (Burmeister, 1865)
 Ethemon basirufum Napp, 1979
 Ethemon brevicorne Napp & Reynaud, 1998
 Ethemon imbasale Tippmann, 1960
 Ethemon iuba Napp & Martins, 2006
 Ethemon lepidum Thomson, 1864
 Ethemon weiseri Bruch, 1926

References

Unxiini